The Sinn Valley Railway (Sinn pronounced "zin") was a branch line that began in the Hessian village of Jossa and ran to Wildflecken via Altengronau in the Bavarian borough of Bad Brückenau.

The line runs from Jossa, initially on the same railway tracks as the line from Flieden to Fulda (the Flieden–Gemünden railway). Shortly after Jossa it branches off onto its own trackbed and runs up the Sinn Valley and into the Rhön Mountains. The railway largely follows the course of the Sinn.

References

Literature 
 Jürgen Lieb: Dampf und Diesel auf der Nebenstrecke Jossa – Bad Brückenau – Wildflecken. Eigenverlag, 2004 edition.

External links 
 Sinn Valley Railway-Kreuzberg Railway Society (IG Sinntalbahn-Kreuzbergbahn)
 Eisenbahnfreunde Sinn Valley Railway (private)
 Sinn Valley Railway at Vergessene Bahnen
 Sinn Valley Railway at spurensuche-eisenbahn.de
 The History of the Sinn Valley Railway, from Jossa to Wildflecken (accessed on 15 September 2011)

Branch lines in Bavaria
Railway lines in Hesse
Main-Kinzig-Kreis
Bad Kissingen